The 2012–13 East Tennessee State Buccaneers basketball team represented East Tennessee State University during the 2012–13 NCAA Division I men's basketball season. The Buccaneers, led by 10th year head coach Murry Bartow, played their home games at the ETSU/Mountain States Health Alliance Athletic Center and were members of the Atlantic Sun Conference. They finished the season 10–22, 8–10 in A-Sun play to finish in eighth place. They lost in the quarterfinals of the Atlantic Sun tournament to Stetson.

Roster

Schedule
 
|-
!colspan=9 style="background:#041E42; color:#FFC72C;"| Exhibition
|-

|-
!colspan=9 style="background:#041E42; color:#FFC72C;"| Regular season
|-

|-

|-

|-
!colspan=9 style="background:#041E42; color:#FFC72C;"| 2013 Atlantic Sun men's basketball tournament

References

East Tennessee State Buccaneers men's basketball seasons
East Tennessee State
East Tennessee
East Tennessee